Gogokhia is a Georgian surname. Notable people with the surname include:

David Gogokhia (born 1987), Georgian experimental visual artist
Enriko Gogokhia (born 1991), Ukrainian kickboxer

Georgian-language surnames
Surnames of Abkhazian origin